The Iaraka River leaf chameleon (Brookesia vadoni), also commonly known as the mossy pygmy leaf chameleon, is a species of chameleon, a lizard in the family Chamaeleonidae. The species is endemic to Madagascar.

Etymology
The specific name, vadoni, is in honor of French naturalist Jean Pierre Léopold Vadon (1904–1970).

Geographic range
B. vadoni is found in northeastern Madagascar.

Habitat

Reproduction
B. vadoni is oviparous.

References

Further reading
Brygoo ER, Domergue CA (1968). "Description d'un nouveau Brookesia de Madagascar B. vadoni n. sp. (Chaméléonidés) ". Bulletin du Muséum national d'Histoire naturelle, Paris 40 (4): 677–682. (Brookesia vadoni, new species). (in French).
Glaw F, Vences M (1994). A Fieldguide to the Amphibians and Reptiles of Madagascar, Second Edition. Cologne, Germany: Vences & Glaw Verlag / Serpents Tale. 480 pp. . (Brookesia vadoni, p. 240).
Glaw F, Vences M (2006). A Field Guide to the Amphibians and Reptiles of Madagascar, Third Edition. Cologne, Germany: Vences & Glaw Verlag. 496 pp. .

Brookesia
chameleon
chameleon
Vulnerable animals
Vulnerable biota of Africa
Reptiles described in 1968
Taxa named by Édouard-Raoul Brygoo
Taxa named by Charles Domergue